Al-Sahiba Madrasa is a 13th-century madrasah located in Damascus, Syria.

See also
Al-Adiliyah Madrasa
Az-Zahiriyah Library
Nur al-Din Madrasa

References

Religious buildings and structures completed in 1245
Mausoleums in Syria
Ayyubid architecture in Syria
Madrasas in Damascus
13th-century establishments in the Ayyubid Sultanate